Mylothris humbloti is a butterfly in the family Pieridae. It is found on the Comoros.

References

External links
Seitz, A. Die Gross-Schmetterlinge der Erde 13: Die Afrikanischen Tagfalter. Plate XIII 10

Butterflies described in 1888
Pierini
Endemic fauna of the Comoros
Taxa named by Charles Oberthür